The Melton Football Netball Club, nicknamed The Bloods, is an Australian rules football and netball club based in the Victorian town of Melton.

The football team currently plays in the Ballarat Football League.

History
Melton Football Club was formed in 1879 when it was known as the Bloods, playing in the Melton and Bacchus Marsh District Football League where the club was successful winning twelve premierships between 1913 and 1963.
Melton moved into the Riddell District Football League in 1973.

Upon entering the Riddell League in 1973 Melton won the premiership in its first year.

With the depth of football standard in the RDFL on the decline, together with considerable opposition from former second division clubs on the formation of one division, the club voted to make the move to the highly rated Ballarat Football League with Sunbury, Darley and Melton South clubs for the commencement of the 1997 playing season.

The club has won three BFL premierships.

Premierships
Ballarat Football League
2000, 2001, 2005, 2022
Riddell District Football League
1973, 1981, 1983, 1984, 1986
Bacchus Marsh Football League
1963
Melton & Bacchus Marsh Football League
1913, 1914, 1915, 1916, 1917, 1918, 1919, 1923, 1930, 1931, 1935

Bibliography
History of Football in the Ballarat District, John Stoward,

References

External links
Facebook site

Ballarat Football League clubs
Sports clubs established in 1879
1879 establishments in Australia
Australian rules football clubs established in 1879
Netball teams in Victoria (Australia)
Australian rules football clubs in Victoria (Australia)
Sport in the City of Melton